Slovak University of Agriculture in Nitra is a public university in Nitra, Slovakia.  It offers Bachelor's, Engineer's (Master's) and Doctoral degrees in six faculties:

Faculty of Agrobiology and Food Resources
Faculty of Biotechnology and Food Sciences
Faculty of Economics and Management
Faculty of Agricultural Engineering
Faculty of European Studies and Regional Development
Faculty of Horticulture and Landscape Engineering

References

External links
Slovak University of Agriculture Website

Buildings and structures in Nitra
Agricultural universities and colleges in Slovakia